Shri Mahendra Mohan a politician from Samajwadi Party is a Member of the Parliament of India representing Uttar Pradesh in the Rajya Sabha, the upper house of the Indian Parliament during 2006–2012.

References

Samajwadi Party politicians
Rajya Sabha members from Uttar Pradesh
Living people
Year of birth missing (living people)
Samajwadi Party politicians from Uttar Pradesh